Kugbo is a Central Delta language of Nigeria.

References

Indigenous languages of Rivers State
Central Delta languages